APEY Ypsona was a Cypriot football club based in Ypsonas, Cyprus. They played sometimes in Third and in Fourth Division.

Honours
 Cypriot Fourth Division:
 Champions (2): 1986 (Limassol-Paphos Group), 1993 (Limassol-Paphos Group)

References

Defunct football clubs in Cyprus